McClenaghan is a surname. Notable people with the surname include:

Kim McClenaghan (born 1974), South African poet and writer
Mitchell McClenaghan (born 1986), New Zealand cricketer
Rhys McClenaghan (born 1999), Irish artistic gymnast
Stewart McClenaghan (1866–1944), Canadian politician

See also
McClenahan